Westward Passage is a 1932 American pre-Code drama film directed by Robert Milton and starring Ann Harding, Laurence Olivier, ZaSu Pitts and Irving Pichel. The screenplay concerns a woman who falls in love and marries, but soon discovers how unpleasant her new husband is. The film marked Olivier's second major role in the United States. It was not a commercial or critical success, and Olivier did not make another film in America until 1939 when he starred in Wuthering Heights. The film recorded a loss of $250,000.

Plot
Newlyweds Olivia and Nick Allen struggle to keep their relationship afloat through personal disagreements. Nick lacks recognition for his works as an independent writer; hence, he is unable to support Olivia and their young daughter. These difficulties eventually lead to a divorce, the last they will see each other for many years. Six years after their divorce, Olivia lives a stable life with her husband, Harry Ottendorf, and her daughter, Little Olivia. Meanwhile, Nick has made a successful and rewarding career in writing but still yearns to be with Olivia. When the two board the same ship returning from Europe to the United States, Olivia is torn between the love of her kindly husband and the attempt by her former husband to rekindle the passion they once shared.

Cast
 Ann Harding as Olivia Allen Ottendorf
 Laurence Olivier as Nick Allen
 ZaSu Pitts as Mrs. Truesdale
 Irving Pichel as Harry Ottendorf
 Juliette Compton as Henrietta
 Irene Purcell as Baroness Diana von Stael
 Emmett King as Mr. Ottendorf
 Florence Roberts as Mrs. Ottendorf
 Ethel Griffies as Lady Caverly
 Bonita Granville as Little Olivia
 Don Alvarado as Count Felipe DeLatorie
 Florence Lake as Elmer's wife
 Edgar Kennedy as Elmer
 Herman Bing as The Dutchman
 Nance O'Neil as Mrs. von Stael
 Joyce Compton as Lillie
 Julie Haydon as Bridesmaid

(cast list as per AFI database)

Reception 
The film was considered a commercial failure, despite its relative popularity. Adapted from Margaret Ayer Barnes' novel Westward Passage, the film was criticized for its lack of logical progression and thematic development when compared to the novel. Olivier's brash delivery and mannerisms garnered mixed reviews, and the critical reception largely delayed the mainstream success Olivier would garner in later films. Some believed that poor dialogue hindered the development and likability of essential characters, including Olivia Ottendorf. Others added Westward Passage to their list of empowering and emotional Ann Harding films.

References

External links 
 
 
 
 

1932 films
1932 drama films
American drama films
American black-and-white films
Films directed by Robert Milton
Seafaring films
RKO Pictures films
Films based on American novels
1930s English-language films
1930s American films